Egal Shidad; is a folk character who was known as the cowardest man. 

From Somalia, Egal Shidad was known for his dislike of wild animals and his inability to take risks. Like many Somali people, Shidad was a nomadic herder of camel and sheep. He traveled the land with his herd in search of water and pasture. Though he was a coward, Shidad was also wise. This resulted into many miscellaneous adventures.

Because of his stories Shidad has come to be known as a folk legend among the Somalis.

References

Year of death uncertain
Somalian poets
Somalian folklore